Sameh Hassan Shoukry  (born 20 October 1952) is an Egyptian diplomat who has been Minister of Foreign Affairs of Egypt since 2014. Previously, Shoukry served as the Ambassador of Egypt to the United States from 2008 to 2012.

Career

From 1976 until 1978, Sameh Shoukry worked as Attaché in the Egyptian Ministry of Foreign Affairs in Cairo.

Between 1978 and 1982, he was the Third Secretary at the Embassy of Egypt in London, United Kingdom.

In 1982, Shoukry became the Second Secretary of the Cabinet of the Deputy Prime Minister and Minister of Foreign Affairs.

From 1984 until 1988, he served as First Secretary of the Embassy of Egypt in Buenos Aires, Argentina.

Between 1988 and 1990, he was counselor of the Cabinet of the Deputy Prime Minister and Minister of Foreign Affairs.

From 1990 until 1994, Shoukry worked as counselor of the Permanent Mission of Egypt to the United Nations in New York.

In 1994, he was director of the United States and Canada Department of the Ministry of Foreign Affairs in Cairo.

Shoukry was a member of the Delegation of Egypt to the 1995 Treaty on the Non-Proliferation of Nuclear Weapons (NPT) Review Conference.

Between 1995 and 1999, he served as Secretary for Information and follow-up to the President of Egypt, Hosni Mubarak.

In 2000, he was Head of Delegation for the Negotiations on the International Treaty to Combat Transnational Organized Crime in Vienna.

From 2001 until 2002, he worked as chairman of the Group of 77 & China to the International Organizations in Vienna.

Between 1999 and 2003, Shoukry served as Ambassador Extraordinary and Plenipotentiary of Egypt to Austria.

In 2003, he became Assistant Foreign Minister and Chief of Protocol of the Ministry of Foreign Affairs of Egypt.

In 2004, he became Chief of Cabinet of the Minister of Foreign Affairs of Egypt.

Between 2005 and 2008, Shoukry was Ambassador and Permanent Representative of Egypt to the United Nations and other International Organizations in Geneva.

From 2008 until 2012, he served as Ambassador of Egypt to the United States.

Shoukry was the Sherpa to the 2012 Seoul Nuclear Security Summit and the 2014 Hague Nuclear Security Summit.

Since 17 June 2014, he has served as Minister of Foreign Affairs of Egypt.

In November 2022, he presided over the United Nations Climate Change Conference.

Personal life
He is married to Suzy Shoukry, and has two sons. He obtained a law degree from Ain Shams University in 1975. A career diplomat, he had ostensibly retired prior to being appointed as Minister of Foreign Affairs in 2014. He speaks Arabic, English and Spanish.

See also

List of current foreign ministers

References

1952 births
Living people
Ain Shams University alumni
Ambassadors of Egypt to Austria
Ambassadors of Egypt to the United States
Foreign ministers of Egypt
Permanent Representatives of Egypt to the United Nations
Diplomats from Cairo
21st-century Egyptian diplomats
20th-century Egyptian diplomats
20th-century Egyptian politicians
21st-century Egyptian politicians